Union Coop (Arabic Name: تعاونية الاتحاد), formerly known as ‘Union Cooperative Society’ جمعية الاتحاد   التعاونية) is an Emirati consumer cooperative located in the emirate of Dubai, UAE. It was founded in the year 1982 by the then Ministry of Labour and Social Affairs, which has now been restructured. 

It is currently the largest Consumer Cooperative in the United Arab Emirates with 23 hypermarket branches and three shopping malls located in the emirate of Dubai. 

Union Coop’s services include establishing hypermarkets, Malls, Commercial Centers and managing cooperatives within the UAE. 

Union Coop currently has branches located in – Al Warqa, Al Quoz, Al Tayy, Nad Al Sheba,  The Pointe – Jumeirah, Abu Hail, International City, Mamzar, and Al Mizhar, Umm Suqeim, Al Barsha, Mirdif, Al Wasl, Al Aweer, Jumeirah, Al Mankhool, Al Twar, Al Hamriya, Al Rashidiya and Al Satwa, Jumeirah 1, Al Barsha South and Hessa Street. Union Coop has 26 branches with recent ones being in motor city, Nad Al Hamar  and Al Nahda.

History

Union Coop was established in the year 1982 with 27 Shareholders and a capital of AED 3.6 Million with an aim to enhance the social and economic condition of its members and serve the local community where it operates.

In the year 1984, Union Coop opened its first branch in AL SATWA, an area in Dubai which is known for its South Asian community.

Timelines

1984 – First Union Coop hypermarket opened in Al Satwa area of Dubai.
1984 – Opens hypermarket branch in the residential area of Al Rashidiya within Dubai Municipality’s Central market. 
1986 – Opens a new hypermarket branch within Dubai Municipality’s Central market in Al Hamriya.
1988 – Opens hypermarket branch in Al Twar, Dubai on Al Nahda road which connects old city to the new one.
1990 – Opens hypermarket branch in Sheikh Khalifa Street in AL Mankhool, Dubai.
1996 – Opens hypermarket branch in Jumeirah.

Projects
The current projects undertaken by Union Coop include - First Hebiah Center in Motor City, Al Nahda Branch (Second Al Nahda), Nad Al Hamar Centre, Dubai Silicon Oasis Centre, Investment in a Commercial Center in Wadi Al-Safa5, Staff Housing Project / Al Quoz, Warsan Staff Accommodation, Al Khawaneej Commercial Centre, Margham Branch Project / Dubai Al Ain Street (Mohammed Sultan Bin Markhan), Jumeirah City Mall and Hatta Land.

Awards and Achievements

Recognized by the CSR Label in the field of Corporate Social Responsibility initiatives for the 9th year in a row, 2019. 
Honored by the Personal Status Court for participation in the ‘Super Winter Merchants’ initiative, 2020.
Honored by Dubai Foundation for Women and Children for its extended support towards the initiatives managed by the foundation, 2021.
Recognized at the GovDX Leadership Summit & Awards 2022.

References

Retailing in the United Arab Emirates
Retail companies of the United Arab Emirates